Tresór Toropité (born 31 July 1994) is a professional football player who plays as a midfielder for DFC8 and the Central African Republic national team.

References

External links
NFT Profile

1994 births
Living people
People from Bangui
DFC 8ème Arrondissement players
Olympic Real de Bangui players
AS Tempête Mocaf players
Central African Republic footballers
Central African Republic international footballers
Association football midfielders